Albert Einstein High School, named after the German-born physicist, is a four-year high school in Kensington, Maryland, that opened on September 7, 1962. It is part of the Montgomery County Public Schools (MCPS) system.

Academic programs

As a part of the Downcounty Consortium, Einstein offers five "academies", which are academic programs that concentrate in specific fields. These include the Academy of Finance, Business, and Marketing; the International Baccalaureate Program; the Visual and Performing Arts Academy; the Renaissance Academy; and recently the Teacher's Academy. It is also home to Montgomery County's Visual Art Center.

Einstein is home to an International Baccalaureate (IB) Diploma Program, which approaches education from a global perspective and allows students to take high-level classes in pursuit of a specialized diploma.

Notable alumni
 Phil Andrews, politician
 Marc Elrich, politician
 David Fraser-Hidalgo, politician
 Pablo Leon, Eisner nominated illustrator, known for Spiderman graphic novel, Miles Morales: Shock Waves, and Assistant Art Director at Disney Television Animation
 Rebecca Sugar, animator, director, screenwriter, producer, and songwriter
 Arnold Ebikiete, defensive end for the Penn State Nittany Lions and the Atlanta Falcons

References

External links 

Albert Einstein High School

Kensington, Maryland
Public high schools in Montgomery County, Maryland
International Baccalaureate schools in Maryland
Educational institutions established in 1962
1962 establishments in Maryland